BBC Pacific Quay is BBC Scotland's television and radio studio complex at Pacific Quay, Glasgow, Scotland. Opened by then Prime Minister Gordon Brown on 20 September 2007, the studios are home to BBC Scotland's television, radio and online services and the headquarters of the BBC in Scotland.

Location
The studios are located adjacent to the Glasgow Science Centre, across the river from the Scottish Exhibition and Conference Centre and adjacent to the studios of commercial broadcaster STV. The new building is one of the most modern digital broadcasting facilities in the world, complete with the BBC's first HD-capable newsroom.

Functioning
Television studio facilities based at BBC Pacific Quay were rebranded as "Street @ BBC Scotland" in 2018.

There are three main television studios based at BBC Pacific Quay:
It can easily accommodate studio audiences of up to 320.
Small studio audiences of up to 100 can be accommodated in Studio B.
It is the home to BBC Scotland's flagship news programme Reporting Scotland, and is also used for local news, politics and current affairs programming for BBC Scotland. Because of this, it is usually not available for use by other productions.

In addition, the Quay stage studio is used to host musical performances in front of a studio audience; acts have included KT Tunstall, Texas and The Fratellis. The central feature of the complex is used to record interviews, host political programming and transmit webcasts such as Authors Live.

The complex also houses facilities needed for television productions, such as nine dressing rooms, large green rooms, audience lounge, make up, wardrobe, production offices and full studio technical support services.

The complex also houses six radio studios used for BBC Radio Scotland, BBC Radio nan Gàidheal and other radio stations.

History
The BBC had outgrown their old headquarters in Queen Margaret Drive, Glasgow. In July 1999 the BBC indicated that around 800 staff would be moving to a new building that would be located at Pacific Quay. The BBC held a competition to design a new building with more than seventy companies attracted. By March 2001 there was a shortlist of seven entries.

The building
The £72 million project on the River Clyde in Glasgow was designed by David Chipperfield Architects, but Keppie Architects took control in late 2004.

References

External links

Buildings and structures in Glasgow
BBC offices, studios and buildings
British television studios
2007 establishments in Scotland
BBC Scotland
Buildings and structures completed in 2007